Male Edition is the debut mixtape by American girl group June's Diary. It was released on June 29, 2017 through SoundCloud. The mixtape features six covers of songs originally recorded by male groups Shai, Jodeci, Bell Biv DeVoe, The Deele, Jagged Edge, and The Beatles and one original song.

Background
On March 16, 2017, June's Diary released a new music video for their cover of Jodeci's "Stay" via their YouTube channel. A behind the scenes video was released the following day via That Grape Juice's YouTube channel.

Critical reception
The mixtape was received with positive reviews from critics. ThisisRnB praised the mixtape thus: "Combining their outstanding vocal talents, inspiration from ’90s R&B and adding their own modern vibes, the mixtape is sure to have fans everywhere hitting replay and wanting more."

Singles
"Stay" was released as the first single from the mixtape on March 20, 2017. The music video premiered four days before the song was released.

Track listing

Release history

References

External links

2017 mixtape albums